David John Wood (born 10 January 1965) is a former English cricketer.  Wood was a left-handed batsman who bowled slow left-arm orthodox.  He was born at Cuckfield, Sussex.

Wood made two first-class appearances for Sussex against Surrey and Hampshire in the 1984 County Championship.  Against Surrey, he scored 15 runs in Sussex's first and only innings of the match, before being dismissed by Graham Monkhouse. The match ended in a draw.  Against Hampshire, Wood scored 12 runs in Sussex's first-innings, before being dismissed by Cardigan Connor, while in their second-innings he was dismissed by Nigel Cowley for 5 runs.  Hampshire won this match by 108 runs.  He made no further major appearances for Sussex after this match.

References

External links
David Wood at ESPNcricinfo
David Wood at CricketArchive

1965 births
Living people
People from Cuckfield
English cricketers
Sussex cricketers